Robert Patrick Gunton Jr. (born November 15, 1945) is an American character actor of stage and screen. He is known for playing strict authoritarian characters, including Warden Samuel Norton in the 1994 prison drama The Shawshank Redemption, Chief George Earle in 1993's Demolition Man, Dr. Walcott, the domineering dean of Virginia Medical School in Patch Adams, and Secretary of State Cyrus Vance in Argo. He also played Leland Owlsley in the Daredevil television series, Secretary of Defense Ethan Kanin in 24, and Noah Taylor in Desperate Housewives.

In addition to his film and television careers, Gunton is a prolific theatre actor. He originated the role of Juan Perón in the Broadway premiere of Evita and the titular character in the 1989 revival of Sweeney Todd: The Demon Barber of Fleet Street, roles for which he received Tony Award nominations. He has received a Drama Desk Award, an Obie Award, and a Clarence Derwent Award.

Early life and education
Gunton was born November 15, 1945, in Santa Monica, California, the son of Rose Marie (née Banovetz) and Robert Patrick Gunton Sr., a labor union executive. He attended Mater Dei High School in Santa Ana, California, the Paulist Seminary St Peter's College, in Baltimore, Maryland, and the University of California, Irvine. A lifelong devout Catholic Christian, Gunton initially planned to be a priest.

He served in the United States Army (1969–71) as a radio telephone operator with the 2nd Battalion, 501st Infantry Regiment of the 101st Airborne Division, and was at the Battle of Fire Support Base Ripcord during the 23-day siege.

He and a comrade were awarded the Bronze Star for returning to the base to retrieve important but forgotten radios in the evacuation's final moments, so that they would not fall into the hands of the People's Army of Vietnam forces about to capture the base. Due to this, he was one of the last people to evacuate. During the battle, he lost one of his dog tags, but it was returned to him over 40 years later in 2018.

Career
Gunton played the role of Juan Perón in the original 1980 Broadway production of Evita, earning a nomination for Tony Award for Best Featured Actor in a Musical for his performance. He had a supporting role in the 1985 HBO film Finnegan Begin Again starring Robert Preston and Mary Tyler Moore. Gunton later starred in the title role of a 1989 Broadway revival of Sweeney Todd and received a second Tony nomination for his portrayal. Additional Broadway credits include Working, King of Hearts, The Music Women, How I Got That Story, and Big River.

Gunton portrayed President Richard Nixon in a recreation of the Watergate tapes incident for Nightline. He also played President Woodrow Wilson in the film Iron Jawed Angels (2004). Gunton is also known for his guest starring role as Capt. Benjamin Maxwell in the well-received 1991 Star Trek: The Next Generation episode "The Wounded". Gunton played Warden Samuel Norton, the head of Shawshank State Prison and the primary antagonist in The Shawshank Redemption (1994) opposite Tim Robbins. Gunton played Cecil Dobbs in the 2011 film The Lincoln Lawyer.

Gunton also guest starred in the first season of Desperate Housewives and the sixth season of 24, where he portrayed United States Secretary of Defense Ethan Kanin. He signed on as series regular afterward and reprised the role of Kanin but now as the Chief of Staff to the new president, Allison Taylor, in the show's seventh season as well as the two-hour television prequel film, 24: Redemption. He returned again for the eighth season but this time as the President's Secretary of State. Gunton portrays Leland Owlsley in the 2015 TV series Daredevil. Gunton made a guest appearance on Law & Order: Special Victims Unit in January 2017.
In 2021, Gunton was used as a body double for Harold Ramis' character Egon Spengler in Ghostbusters: Afterlife.

Stage credits

Filmography

Film

Television

References

Further reading
 Voisin, Scott. Character Kings: Hollywood's Familiar Faces Discuss the Art & Business of Acting. BearManor Media, 2009. .

External links
 
 
 

1945 births
American male film actors
American male television actors
American male stage actors
American Roman Catholics
Drama Desk Award winners
Living people
Male actors from Santa Monica, California
University of California, Irvine alumni
United States Army personnel of the Vietnam War
United States Army soldiers